Maine Dil Tujhko Diya is a 2002 Indian Hindi romantic action film, directed, produced, written by and starring Sohail Khan, who makes his acting debut along with another debutante, Sameera Reddy. The film also features Sanjay Dutt, Kabir Bedi and Dalip Tahil in supporting roles.

Plot
Ajay is head of his college group named the Aryans, and they all wear the same jacket. Ajay is introduced to a girl named Ayesha and they become friends first. Gradually, Ajay and Ayesha fall in love with each other after Ayesha slaps Aryan to take his jacket. This enrages Ayesha's father because of his status as a poor man who cannot afford more than one jacket. Ajay challenges to get Ayesha back to him in the nick of time, which seems quite challenging to Mr. Varma, Ayesha's daddy. Mr. Varma's friend and business partner Mister Chopra also becomes enraged suddenly and decides to finish off Ajay, but Chopra has an ulterior motive, for Chopra's son to marry Ayesha to acquire the Varma family's wealth.

So Chopra appoints a notorious criminal Bhaijaan to finish off Ajay. But Bhaijaan refuses as he does not do any wrong deeds in the month of Ramadan. So Bhaijaan appoints his two head henchmen Munna & Chhote. Ajay at first empowers them during a fight but no sooner do the formers appoint a gang to beat up Ajay brutally and leave him for dead on the street. Ajay recovers quite soon from his injuries and enters Varma's mansion through the gate. An enraged Ajay challenges Varma to get back Ayesha at any and all costs. Verma too keeps one condition, if within 24 hours he didn't get back to Ayesha, he will have to get out of her life forever. Ajay accepts this deal as he is studying business. Again Chopra plans a conspiracy and arrests Ajay without any crime.

The police inspector first beats Ajay up and the inspector gets almost equally beaten up brutally and Ajay runs the jail. Now Chopra calls Chhote to kill Ajay and promises to give him loads of money but Chhote replies that Ramadan is ended and Bhaijaan will finish Ajay and so he doesn't need the money. This conversation gets taped by Ayesha's little sister. Ajay gets surrounded by henchmen and knocks on each one but is interrupted by Bhaijaan. Just before Bhaijaan is about to kill Ajay, the former says he is doing love and will die only once in love. This made Bhaijaan save Ajay happily. The reason was Bhaijaan had a brother Irfan who committed suicide because Bhaijaan didn't care for his love feelings that he had been developing for some girl.

During Eid ul Fitr Bhaijaan thanks Allah for giving a pretty boy like Ajay in turn of his deceased brother and decides to help him. The very day, Ajay arrives at the Verma's mansion within 24 hours and decides to stop the wedding of Raman Chopra and Ayesha. Bhaijaan, who has a change of heart and helps him but is soon interrupted by Chhote. Chhote disobeys Bhaijaan and soon a fight ensues. Bhaijaan requests Ajay to go but he is beaten up badly. Ajay interrupts the wedding and points a gun at Verma which is given to him by the priest. Soon Ajay and Ayesha get married quickly. Just when Verma is about to kill Ajay, at that second Mini plays the tape of the deal to her father and soon Chopra and Raman are kicked off out of the house. Bhaijaan kills all the henchmen with a sword and finally slits Munna and Chhote with a sword. The film ends on a happy note with Ayesha and Ajay are united and Bhaijaan reconciling with Ajay because he reminds him of his brother who was also pretty.

Cast 
Sanjay Dutt as Bhaijaan
Sohail Khan as Ajay
Sameera Reddy as Ayesha Verma
Eijaz Khan as Eijaz, Ajay's friend.
Kabir Bedi as Mr. Verma, Ayesha's father.
Dalip Tahil as Mr. Chopra
Amrita Prakash as Mini, Ayesha's sister.
Neeraj Vora as College Principal / Pandit
Rajpal Yadav as Munna
Sarfaraz Khan as Chhote
Raja Bherwani as Chopra’s son
Bobby Darling
Sikandar Kharbanda as Head of Warriors' team.
Nirmal Shah as Chhotu
Vikas Sharma as Vicky
Sadanand Yadav as Sada
Aashif Sheikh as Inspector Raman Chopra

Soundtrack
The lyrics for the film were penned by Faaiz Anwar, Salim Bijnori, Gufi Paintal, Jalees & Rashid, while the music was composed by Daboo Malik.

Critical reception
Taran Adarsh rated the film 2 out of 5, praising the acting and direction. Sukanya Verma from Rediff.com criticised the film, terming it as "You can be forgiven for mistaking the actors".

References

External links 
 

2000s Hindi-language films
2002 films
Indian romantic action films
Films shot in Mumbai
2000s romantic action films
Films scored by Daboo Malik
Films shot in Egypt
Films shot in Wales